The Benevolent Volume Lurkings is an EP by Norwegian big beat duo Xploding Plastix, released on Columbia Records in 2003. It features a remix by Joseph Nothing.

Track listing
"Shakedown Shutoff" - 3:47
"The Famous Biting Guy" - 3:45
"Skinny Love Spasm" - 3:41
"Joy Comes In The Morning" - 4:43
"The Famous Biting Guy (Joseph Nothing Remix)" - 4:10

Xploding Plastix albums
2003 EPs